RAFC can stand for:

 Rabat Ajax F.C., a Maltese association football club
 RAF College Cranwell
 Rangiora A.F.C., a New Zealand association football club
 Richmond Athletic F.C., a New Zealand association football club
 Rochdale Association Football Club, an English association football club
 Royal Antwerp FC, a Belgian association football club
 Royal Albert F.C., a Scottish association football club

See also
 RFC (disambiguation)